is a station jointly operated by JR West and Ibara Railway on the Hakubi, Kibi, and Ibara Lines. The station is in Kiyone, Kami-Nakajima, Sōja, Okayama Prefecture, Japan. Sōja Station is the terminus of the Kibi Line, and the beginning of the Ibara Line.

History
1925-02-17: Higashi-Sōja Station opens
1959-11-01: Higashi-Sōja Station is renamed to Sōja Station
1987-04-01: Japanese National Railways is privatized, and Sōja Station becomes a JR West station
1999-01-11: Ibara Railway's Ibara Line opens with service connecting Sōja and Kannabe Stations
Spring 2007: Automatic ticket gates will be installed
Summer 2007: The ICOCA card was scheduled to be accepted

Station building and platforms
Sōja Station has two platforms capable of handling six lines simultaneously. Each platform has an upper (上り, nobori) and lower end (下り, kudari). Hakubi Line trains occasionally use platform three.

Environs
The Sōja city offices, the Tenmaya Happy Town Ribu Sōja Store, and the Calpis Okayama Plant are near Sōja Station.

Highway access
 Japan National Route 180
 Japan National Route 486
 Okayama Prefectural Route 421 (Sōja Teishajō Route)
 Okayama Prefectural Route 469 (Kurashiki-Sōja Route)

Connecting lines
JR West Hakubi Line
Kiyone Station — Sōja Station — Gōkei Station
Ibara Railways Ibara Line
(line begins) Sōja Station — Kiyone Station
Kibi Line
Higashi-Sōja Station — Sōja Station (end of line)

See also
List of Railway Stations in Japan
Gunma-Sōja Station (on the Joetsu Line in Gunma Prefecture)

External links

 JR West

Hakubi Line
Ibara Railway Ibara Line
Kibi Line
Railway stations in Okayama Prefecture
Railway stations in Japan opened in 1925